The mountain sooty boubou (Laniarius poensis), western boubou or mountain boubou, is a species of bird in the family Malaconotidae.

Taxonomy

It was formerly considered conspecific with the Albertine sooty boubou (Laniarius holomelas), with Willard's sooty boubou (Laniarius willardi), and with Fülleborn's sooty boubou (Laniarius fuelleborni).

Two subspecies are currently recognized: nominate L. p. poensis, which is endemic to Bioko; and L. p. camerunensis which occurs on mainland Africa.

Distribution and habitat

It is found in the Cameroon line from Bioko, Equatorial Guinea north to Mount Oku, Cameroon and the Obudu Plateau, Nigeria. In the Cameroon highlands, it is found in montane forests, usually above 600 m in elevation. On Mount Cameroon, this species can occur at extremely low elevations on the windward slopes near the coast, with records from as low as c. 520 m above sea level. On both Bioko and Mt. Cameroon, this taxon is restricted to montane forests.

References

mountain sooty boubou
Birds of the Gulf of Guinea
Birds of Central Africa
mountain sooty boubou
Taxonomy articles created by Polbot